The 2016 Amgen Tour of California Women's Race (also known as the Amgen Breakaway From Heart Disease Women's Race Empowered by SRAM for sponsorship reasons) was the second edition of the Tour of California Women's Race cycling stage race. It is scheduled to run from 19 to 22 May 2016, and is part of the 2016 UCI Women's World Tour. It will begin in South Lake Tahoe and finish in Sacramento.

Schedule

Teams

Results

Stage 1
19 May 2016 – South Lake Tahoe – South Lake Tahoe,

Stage 2
20 May 2016 – Folsom – Folsom: TTT,

Stage 3
21 May 2016 – Santa Rosa – Santa Rosa,

Stage 4
22 May 2016 – Sacramento – Sacramento,

Classification leadership

References

External links
 Official website 

women
Tour of California
Tour of California
California
Women's sports in California